Eradu Nakshatragalu  is a 1983 Indian Kannada-language film, directed by Singeetham Srinivasa Rao. The film stars Rajkumar, Ambika and Puneeth Rajkumar. The movie is famous for its evergreen songs which were composed by G. K. Venkatesh. The plot of the movie is based on the popular novel The Prince and the Pauper by Mark Twain. Puneeth Rajkumar played a double role in the movie and remains his only double-role movie in which both the characters appear together on-screen.

Cast 
 Rajkumar as Vijaya
 Ambika (Voice dubbed by B. Jayashree)
 Leelavathi
 Puneeth Rajkumar (double role, credited as Master Lohith)
 Thoogudeepa Srinivas
 Shivaram
 Shakti Prasad
 Lokanath
 Uma Shivakumar
 M. S. Umesh

Soundtrack 

Rajkumar, who was impressed by Ghulam Ali's ghazal Dil mein ek lehar  si uthi hai abhi,  asked the music director to recreate the song which resulted in Gelathi baaradu intha samaya.

Awards 
 Karnataka State Film Awards
 Best Child actor - Master Lohith

References

External Source 
 

1982 films
1980s Kannada-language films
Films scored by G. K. Venkatesh
Films directed by Singeetam Srinivasa Rao
Indian epic films
Films based on The Prince and the Pauper